Amir Gavabor (also Romanized as Amīr Gavābor) is a village in Rahimabad Rural District, Rahimabad District, Rudsar County, Gilan Province, Iran. At the 2006 census, its population was 143, in 33 families.

References 

Populated places in Rudsar County